Sir Hedworth Williamson, 7th Baronet (1 November 1797 – 24 April 1861) was an English Whig politician who sat in the House of Commons in two periods between 1831 and 1852. He was educated at St John's College, Cambridge.

Williamson was the son of Sir Hedworth Williamson, 6th Baronet. He inherited the baronetcy from his father in 1810.

Career
Williamson was elected Member of Parliament (MP) for County Durham at the 1831 general election and held the seat until 1832 when it was divided under the Great Reform Act. He was then elected at the 1832 general election as an MP for North Durham, and held the seat until he stood down at the 1837 general election. He was High Sheriff of Durham in 1840. In December 1847 he was elected at a by-election as MP for Sunderland and held the seat until he stood down at the 1852 general election.

Marriage and family
Williamson married Anne Elizabeth Liddell (1801–1878), daughter of the first Baron Ravensworth.
Their son Hedworth succeeded to the baronetcy. Their daughter Maria Dorothea married David Barclay who was also an MP for Sunderland.

References

External links 
 

1797 births
1861 deaths
Baronets in the Baronetage of England
Whig (British political party) MPs
Alumni of St John's College, Cambridge
Members of the Parliament of the United Kingdom for English constituencies
UK MPs 1831–1832
UK MPs 1832–1835
UK MPs 1847–1852
High Sheriffs of Durham